Road 56 is a road in central Iran. It connects the central city of Qom in Qom province to western city of Borujerd in Lorestan province. It starts from  the northern Ring road of Qom  then connects Qom - and via other roads Tehran and Esfahan - to the industrial city of Arak. After Arak it continues towards west and it  ends in  Borujerd there run into by Road 37 & Road 52.

Gallery

References

External links 

 Iran road map on Young Journalists Club

Roads in Iran
Transportation in Lorestan Province
Transportation in Markazi Province
Transport in Qom
Transportation in Qom Province
Transport in Arak